Galina Stancheva is a Bulgarian former volleyball player who competed in the 1980 Summer Olympics.

In 1980 she was a squad member of the Bulgarian team which won the bronze medal in the Olympic tournament.

References 
 International Olympic Committee medal database

Year of birth missing (living people)
Living people
Bulgarian women's volleyball players
Olympic volleyball players of Bulgaria
Volleyball players at the 1980 Summer Olympics
Olympic bronze medalists for Bulgaria
Olympic medalists in volleyball
Medalists at the 1980 Summer Olympics